Chief Sunrise Education Centre is a publicly funded JK-12 school, located in K'atl'odeche First Nation (also known as the Hay River Dene Reserve) in the Northwest Territories, Canada. The facility provides education for approximately 52 students. The administration of the school is the responsibility of the South Slave Divisional Education Council (SSDEC).

References

High schools in the Northwest Territories
Middle schools in the Northwest Territories
Elementary schools in the Northwest Territories